Randy Kirner (born in 1946 in Los Angeles, California), is an American politician and a former Republican member of the Nevada Assembly since February 7, 2011 representing District 26.

Education
Kirner earned his BS in business administration from North Georgia College & State University (now University of North Georgia), his MBA from Georgia State University, his MS from West Coast University, and his EdD from the University of La Verne.

Elections
2012 Kirner was unopposed for the June 12, 2012 Republican Primary and won the November 6, 2012 General election with 19,926 votes (60.75%) against Democratic nominee Rodney Petzak, who had previously run in 2004.
2010 When Republican Assemblyman Ty Cobb ran for Nevada Senate and left the District 26 seat open, Kirner won the four-way June 8, 2010 Republican Primary with 3,395 votes (37.30%), and won the three-way November 2, 2010 General election with 16,264 votes (55.66%) against Democratic nominee Angie Taylor and Independent American candidate Gregory Miller (who had previous run for the seat in 2002 and 2004).

References

External links
Official page at the Nevada Legislature
Campaign site
 

Date of birth missing (living people)
1946 births
Living people
Georgia State University alumni
Republican Party members of the Nevada Assembly
People from Los Angeles
Politicians from Reno, Nevada
University of La Verne alumni
21st-century American politicians